Guilherme Filipe Salgado Ferreira (born 17 April 1991) is a Portuguese footballer who plays for Mafra.

Football career
On 12 October 2014, Ferreira made his professional debut with Santa Clara in a 2014–15 Segunda Liga match against Portimonense.

References

External links

1991 births
People from Vila Franca de Xira
Sportspeople from Lisbon District
Living people
Portuguese footballers
Association football defenders
U.D. Vilafranquense players
Real S.C. players
G.D. Vitória de Sernache players
C.D. Fátima players
Sport Benfica e Castelo Branco players
C.D. Santa Clara players
S.C. Olhanense players
C.D. Mafra players
Liga Portugal 2 players
Campeonato de Portugal (league) players